New York 2140 is a 2017 climate fiction novel by American science fiction author Kim Stanley Robinson. The novel is set in a New York City that has been flooded and altered by rising water. The novel received generally positive reviews.

Setting
The novel occurs mostly in a fictional future New York City, permanently inundated by two major rises in seawater levels caused by climate change. Most of New York City is permanently underwater, however, people still live in the upper floors of the buildings, much like in the Venice of today. Robinson has said that the novel does not take place in the same "future history" as his novel 2312.

Most of Manhattan below 46th Street is flooded, and has earned the nickname "SuperVenice". Several of the book's characters live in the MetLife Tower on 23rd Street, which the tenant association has outfitted with flood-prevention mechanisms and boat storage. Robinson chose to prominently feature the building as it was designed to resemble the St Mark's Campanile in Venice. 

The affluent live in newly constructed skyscrapers in Uptown Manhattan and near The Cloisters, as both locations remain above water. Denver has replaced New York as the center of American finance and culture, and much of the United States has been deliberately abandoned by humans in order to make room for wildlife. Robinson has previously addressed sea level rise directly and indirectly in his works Aurora, 2312, and the Mars trilogy.

Scientific accuracy
The book is set in a New York City suffering from a 50-foot rise in seawater. A rise on that scale would likely mean that some portions of Manhattan, Brooklyn, and Queens would be flooded, but not to the extent as featured in the novel. According to Robinson, he set the novel in 2140, as he wanted the setting to be recognizable, while the sea-level rise in the novel was possible but "extreme".

Themes
The novel is critical of capitalism, unregulated financial systems, and market economies. Many of the citizens of the city live in co-ops and rely on organizations that pool resources, while the affluent live in former office buildings and newly built skyscrapers above 125th Street and in Yonkers.

Reception
According to the literary criticism aggregator Literary Hub, critics gave the novel generally positive reviews. Gerry Canavan, writing for the Los Angeles Review of Books, referred to the novel as a further step in Robinson's "[...] construction of a huge metatextual history of the future...distributed across overlapping but distinct and mutually irreconcilable texts".

In 2022 article published by the New York Times about Robinson, Alexandra Alter referred to the novel as "oddly uplifting".

References

External links
"Kim Stanley Robinson Tackles How to Keep a Drowning City Afloat" on Science Friday

2017 American novels
American science fiction novels
Novels by Kim Stanley Robinson
Fiction set on Saturn
Novels set in the 22nd century
Novels set in New York City
Orbit Books books
Environmental fiction books
Climate change novels